Cameron Roland Kurle (born 19 July 1997) is a British swimmer. He has won a gold and two silvers as a junior at the 2015 European Games. As a senior, he won a silver medal in freestyle relay in the 2018 Commonwealth Games.

Personal
Kurle attended Millfield School.

Career
At the 2015 European Games in Baku, Azerbaijan, he won a gold in the men's 4x100m freestyle relay, and two silvers: in the men's 200m freestyle, and 4x200m freestyle relays.

He competed in the men's 200 metre freestyle event at the 2016 Summer Olympics.

At the 2018 Commonwealth Games held at the Gold Coast, Australia, Kurle won two silvers as part of the team that finished second in the Men's 4x100m and 4x200m freestyle events. He swam in the final of the 4x200m but only in the heats of the 4x100m.

At the 2018 European Championships, Kurle was part of the relay teams that won gold in the 4 × 200 metre freestyle relay and bronze in the 4×200 m mixed freestyle. However, he swam in the heats of both events and not in the finals.

References

External links
 
 
 
 
 
 

1997 births
Living people
British male swimmers
Olympic swimmers of Great Britain
Swimmers at the 2015 European Games
Swimmers at the 2016 Summer Olympics
People from Glastonbury
Sportspeople from Somerset
Commonwealth Games medallists in swimming
Commonwealth Games silver medallists for England
Swimmers at the 2018 Commonwealth Games
Swimmers at the 2022 Commonwealth Games
British male freestyle swimmers
European Aquatics Championships medalists in swimming
European Games medalists in swimming
European Games gold medalists for Great Britain
European Games silver medalists for Great Britain
Team Bath swimmers
People educated at Millfield
Medallists at the 2018 Commonwealth Games
Medallists at the 2022 Commonwealth Games